Le Couteur Peak is a peak between Cirque Peak and Omega Peak, in the northern part of the Millen Range, Antarctica. It was named by the Southern Party of the New Zealand Federated Mountain Clubs Antarctic Expedition, 1962–63, for P. C. Le Couteur, a geologist with this party.

References

Mountains of Victoria Land
Pennell Coast